This is a list of African-American newspapers that have been published in Tennessee.  It includes both current and historical newspapers.  

More than 100 such papers have been published in Tennessee. The first was The Colored Tennessean, first published in Nashville on April 29, 1865.  

Newspapers currently in publication are highlighted in green in the list below.

Newspapers

See also 
List of African-American newspapers and media outlets
List of African-American newspapers in Alabama
List of African-American newspapers in Arkansas
List of African-American newspapers in Georgia
List of African-American newspapers in Kentucky
List of African-American newspapers in Mississippi
List of African-American newspapers in Missouri
List of African-American newspapers in North Carolina
List of African-American newspapers in Virginia
List of newspapers in Tennessee

Works cited

References 

Newspapers
Tennessee
African-American
African-American newspapers